No matarás ("Do Not Kill") is a 1943 Mexican film. It was directed by 
Chano Urueta and was the debut film of actress Katy Jurado, who was only 19 at the time it was released.

External links
 

1943 films
1940s Spanish-language films
Films directed by Chano Urueta
Mexican black-and-white films
Mexican drama films
1943 drama films
1940s Mexican films